Richard Bradshaw may refer to:

Richard Bradshaw (conductor) (1944–2007), British opera conductor and General Director of the Canadian Opera Company
Richard Bradshaw (footballer), English footballer
Richard Bradshaw (puppeteer) (born 1938), Australian puppeteer
 Richard Bradshaw, 17th century Ambassador of the Kingdom of England to Russia
Richard Bradshaw (British Army officer) (1920–1999), Director General Army Medical Services, 1977–1981